Jadavpur Vidyapith is a Bengali medium school in the Jadavpur area of metropolitan Kolkata, India, established in 1957. Its campus borders that of Jadavpur University. The school building houses a teacher training institute belonging to Jadavpur University.

References

External links 
 Official website for Nursery and Primary
 Official website For Day (V - XII)

High schools and secondary schools in West Bengal
Schools in Kolkata
Educational institutions established in 1957
1957 establishments in West Bengal